Christopher Hoffman (born June 26, 1978) is an American cellist, composer, sound technician and filmmaker.  He leads the Christopher Hoffman Quartet, MULTIFARIAM and experimental rock band Company Of Selves. Hoffman plays with saxophonists James Brandon Lewis and Michael Blake and is a longtime member of Henry Threadgill's Zooid. In his review of Hoffman's 2021 album Asp Nimbus, New York Times jazz critic Giovanni Russenello wrote, "The cellist Christopher Hoffman's unruly, unorthodox quartet moves around with its limbs loose, but its body held together".

Career

In 2000 Hoffman began working as an associate engineer at Chicago Recording Company while performing with such notable Chicago artists as Fred Lonberg-Holm, Vincent Davis, several theater companies and his own Aberration Quartet.

Hoffman moved to New York City in 2002, starting a position as manager of production & engineering at School of Jazz (The New School).

In 2006 he joined actor and musician Michael Pitt's rock band Pagoda.

Hoffman formed Slow To Wake in 2007 with EJ Fry & Geoff Krealy.

In 2008 he released The Other with his brothers Ian and Dylan Hoffman under the name Needers & Givers.

In 2010 he collaborated with Michael Pitt for Martin Scorsese's Shutter Island with Hoffman arranging and performing a multi-tracked cello version of Gustav Mahler's A Minor Piano Quartet for the end credits.That year he joined Henry Threadgill's Zooid and has appeared on six of Threadgill's records. Most notably the 2016 Pulitzer Prize winning In For A Penny, In For A Pound.

In 2014 Hoffman played on the Juno Award nominated Mirror Of The Mind by Earl MacDonald.

Hoffman released Silver Cord Quintet in 2016 featuring Tony Malaby & Kris Davis. 

In 2018 he released MULTIFARIAM featuring Tony Malaby, Christina Courtin & Gerald Cleaver. Hoffman also played on Andy Milne's album The Seasons of Being which won the Juno Award for 2019 Jazz Album of the Year.

In 2019 he appeared on Anat Cohen's Grammy Nominated Triple Helix and Anna Webber's Clockwise which was included in the 2019 NPR Music Jazz Critics Poll.

In 2021 Hoffman released Asp Nimbus featuring David Virelles, Bryan Carrott, Rashaan Carter & Craig Weinrib. It made Bandcamp's Best Jazz of 2021(13) and was featured on The New York Times: The Playlist. He is a member of James Brandon Lewis's Red Lily Quintet whose 2021 release Jesup Wagon was named Best Jazz Album Of 2021 by The New York Times, NPR, Slate, JazzTimes, PopMatters, Stereo Gum, The Wire, Magnet & The New York City Jazz Record.

Hoffman has performed with Yoko Ono, Bleachers, Marianne Faithfull, Iron & Wine, Ryan Adams, Lee Konitz and Marc Ribot.
Hoffman formed Slow To Wake in 2007 with EJ Fry and Geoff Krealy.

Discography

As a leader
 2002 Aberration Quartet (Fever Pitch Records)
 2007 Iosono (Fever Pitch Records)
 2011 Induction (HPR)
 2015 Company Of Selves, Butterfly Handlers & Memory Travelers (Fleeting Youth Records)
 2016 Silver Cord Quintet (Asclepius Records)
 2018 MULTIFARIAM (Asclepius Records)
 2021 Asp Nimbus (Out Of Your Head Records)

With Henry Threadgill
 2012 Tomorrow Sunny / The Revelry, Spp (Pi)
 2015 In For A Penny, In For A Pound (Pi)
 2016 Old Locks and Irregular Verbs (Pi)
 2018 Double Up, Plays Double Up Plus (Pi)
 2018 Dirt…And More Dirt (Pi)
 2021 Poof (Pi)

With Tony Malaby
 2014 Tony Malaby, Scorpian Eater (Clean Feed)
 2021 Tony Malaby/William Parker/Billy Mintz, Scratch The Horse

With James Brandon Lewis
 2021 Red Lilly Quintet, Jesup Wagon (Tao Forms)

With Jeremiah Cymerman
 2007 Big Exploitation (Soloponticello)
 2010 Under A Blue Grey Sky (Porter Records)
 2011 Fire Sign (Tzadik)
 2014 Pale Horse (5049)
 2016 Badlands (5049)

As a sideman
 2001 Scott Rosenberg, Creative Orchestra Music Chicago 2001
 2003 Vig ESP, Neon Meate Dream of a Octafish :A Tribute To Captain Beefheart & His Magic Band (Animal World)
 2005 Harel Shachal & Anistar, Esh
 2005 Elizabeth & The Catapult, Elizabeth & The Catapult
 2006 Ryan Scott, Five O'Clock News (Crystal Top)
 2006 Frank LoCrasto, When You're There (MaxJazz)
 2006 Manuel Valera, Melancolia (Mavo)
 2007 Angus & Julia Stone, A Book Like This (EMI)
 2007 Clare & The Reasons, The Movie (Frog Stand)
 2007 Billy Fox, Uncle Wiggly Suite (Clean Feed)
 2007 Ryan Scott, Smoke & Licorice (Velour)
 2008 John Shannon, American Mystic (ObliqueSound)
 2008 Dar Williams, Born To the Breed: A Tribute to Judy Collins (Wildflower)
 2008 Haale, No Ceiling (Channel A)
 2008 Needers & Givers, The Other (Loose Tooth)
 2008 John Hadfield, Eye Of Gordon
 2009 Mantis (SCI Fidelity)
 2009 Matthew Welch, Luminosity (Porter)
 2009 Bebel Gilberto, All In One (Verve)
 2009 Willie Nile, House Of A Thousand Guitars (GB/River House)
 2010 Olivier Manchon, Orchestre de Chambre Miniature, Vol 1 (Obliqsound)
 2011 Ian Hoffman, Dome Swan (HPR)
 2012 Adam Sorensen, Midwest
 2013 Earl MacDonald, Mirror Of The Mind
 2014 Juan Pablo Carletti/Tony Malaby, Nino / Brujo (NoBuisness)
 2014 Tony Malaby, Scorpian Eater (Clean Feed)
 2015 Anthony Coleman, You (New World Records)
 2016 LabTrio/Michael Attias, The Owls Are Not What They Seem
 2018 Yoni Kretzmer, Months, Weeks and Days (OutNow)
 2018 Andy Milne, Seasons Of Being (Sunnyside)
 2018 Josh Sinton/Tom Rainey, Making Bones (Iluso)
 2018 Ari Chersky, Fear Sharpens The Dagger
 2018 Adam Sorensen, Dust Cloud Refrain
 2019 Eliot Krimsky, Wave In Time (Pretty Purgatory)
 2019 Anna Webber, Clockwise (Pi)
 2019 Anat Cohen Tentet, Triple Helix (Anzic)
 2020 Andy Bragen/John Ellis, The Ice Siren
 2021 Jessica Pavone, Lull (Chaikin)
 2021 Danny Lubin Laden, Through Our Time
 2023 Michael Blake, Dance of the Mystic Bliss (P&M Records)

References 

1978 births
Living people
American cellists
American composers
People from Park Ridge, Illinois
Musicians from Illinois